The 2020 season was the 111th season in the history of Sport Club Corinthians Paulista. The season was largerly affected by the COVID-19 pandemic, as it had a major pause between March and July, and the majority of games were played behind closed doors. It covered the period from January 2020 to 25 February 2021.

Background

Kits
 Home (July 2020 onward): White shirt, black shorts and white socks;
 Away (July 2020 onward): Black with white stripes shirt, white shorts and black socks;
 Third (October 2020 onward): Brown and blue shirt, brown shorts and brown socks.

Previous Kits
 Home (Until June 2020): White shirt with black stripes, black shorts and white socks;
 Away (Until July 2020): Black shirt, white shorts and black socks;
 Third (Until September 2020): Black and white shirt, black shorts and black socks.

COVID-19 pandemic
On 25 February 2020, the first case of COVID-19 was confirmed in Brazil. No decision was made regarding sports events at first, but after the disease started spreading quickly, it was announced on March 13 that some of the 2020 Campeonato Paulista matches would take place behind closed doors. Eventually on March 16, after the Confederação Brasileira de Futebol had decided to postpone their tournaments indefinitely, the Federação Paulista de Futebol also decided to suspend the Campeonato Paulista for the time being.

It was announced on 26 March that the clubs decided to grant 20 days of vacation from 1 April until 20 April for their players. That period was extended for another 10 days on April 15. Corinthians announced on 30 April that 25% of the players' salary and 70% of the staff's salary would be reduced amid the pandemic. On 23 June, the club made a return to non-contact training, with social distancing rules still in place, while a full-return only began on 1 July. During return tests, 24 players tested positive (13 of them already recovered) and 34 people from the staff as well (with 29 of them recovered).

On 8 July, it was announced that the Campeonato Paulista would return on 22 July, while the 2020 Campeonato Brasileiro Série A would begin on 8 August. The season is now expected to end on 24 February 2021.

Arena Corinthians' naming rights
On 1 September (Corinthians' 110th anniversary), a special event live from the stadium was held to announce the Arena's new name. It was officially renamed Neo Química Arena, part of a 20-year partnership with Hypera Pharma, Brazil's largest pharmaceutical company. Neo Química is Hypera's generic drugs division, which already served as Corinthians' main sponsor during the 2010 and 2011 seasons. The full contract is expected to be around R$300–320 million.

Presidential election
On 28 November, the election to decide Corinthians' new president for the 2021–2023 term was held featuring only associates of the social club, meaning that less than three thousand people would decide the winner. Duílio Monteiro Alves (who was Sanchez's football director until September) defeated former president Mário Gobbi Filho and August Melo with only 1081 votes (38 percent of the total).

Duílio assumed office on 4 January 2021, bringing back former president Roberto de Andrade as the new football director and Alessandro Nunes (captain of the 2012 Copa Libertadores and 2012 FIFA Club World Cup titles) as football manager.

Sponsorship
On January 23, 2021, Corinthians announced that Banco BMG would not remain as the main sponsor, but rather move to a different spot in the uniform. Two days later, it was announced that Neo Química will be the new main sponsor for the next five seasons.

Squad

Managerial changes
On September 11, 2020, Tiago Nunes was fired after losing a home match a day earlier to Palmeiras. Despite being hired on November 7, 2019, he only took charge at the beginning of this season. The club announced that Dyego Coelho, former player and current U20 manager, would take over as caretaker.

On October 12, 2020, Coelho was removed from his interim position and Corinthians announced Vágner Mancini, who was then-Atlético Goianiense manager, as their new head coach.

Transfers

Transfers in

Loans in

Transfers out

Loans out

Squad statistics

Overview

Pre-season and friendlies

Florida Cup

Campeonato Paulista

For the 2020 Campeonato Paulista, the 16 teams were divided in four groups of 4 teams (A, B, C, D). They faced all teams, except those that are in their own group, with the top two teams from each group qualifying for the quarterfinals. The two overall worst teams were relegated. The tournament returned to a previous format in which the quarter-finals and semi-finals were held in one-match playoffs.

First stage

Knockout stages

Copa Libertadores

Qualifying stages

Campeonato Brasileiro

Results

Copa do Brasil

Due to being qualified for the 2020 Copa Libertadores, Corinthians entered the competition at the round of 16.

Knockout stages

See also
List of Sport Club Corinthians Paulista seasons

Notes

References

Sport Club Corinthians Paulista seasons
Corinthians